The 1894 New York Giants season was the franchise's 12th season. The team finished second in the National League pennant race with an 88–44 record, 3 games behind the Baltimore Orioles.  After the regular season's conclusion, they participated in the first Temple Cup competition against the first-place Orioles. The Giants won in a sweep, four games to none. During the season, the Giants scored 962 runs, the most in franchise history.

Offseason 
 February 27, 1894: Charlie Petty, Jack McMahon, and $7,500 were traded by the Giants to the Washington Senators for Duke Farrell and Jouett Meekin.

Regular season

Season standings

Record vs. opponents

Roster

Player stats

Batting

Starters by position 
Note: Pos = Position; G = Games played; AB = At bats; H = Hits; Avg. = Batting average; HR = Home runs; RBI = Runs batted in

Other batters 
Note: G = Games played; AB = At bats; H = Hits; Avg. = Batting average; HR = Home runs; RBI = Runs batted in

Pitching

Starting pitchers 
Note: G = Games pitched; IP = Innings pitched; W = Wins; L = Losses; ERA = Earned run average; SO = Strikeouts

Other pitchers 
Note: G = Games pitched; IP = Innings pitched; W = Wins; L = Losses; ERA = Earned run average; SO = Strikeouts

Notes

References
1894 New York Giants season at Baseball Reference

External links

New York Giants (NL)
San Francisco Giants seasons
New York Giants season
New York Giants
19th century in Manhattan
Washington Heights, Manhattan